The Wellington and Manawatu Railway Company (WMR or W&MR) was a private railway company that built, owned and operated the Wellington-Manawatu railway line between Thorndon in Wellington, the capital of New Zealand, and Longburn, near Palmerston North in the Manawatu, between 1881 and 1908, when it was acquired by the New Zealand Government Railways. Its successful operation in private ownership was unusual for early railways in New Zealand.

History 
At the time of the company's founding in 1881, the government had built the Foxton Branch railway linking Palmerston North and Foxton, and had completed surveys of lines down the west coast to Wellington. The government of Sir George Grey had approved the construction of the line, which was included in the Public Works Estimates of 27 August 1878. The final details of the survey were completed, and the first workers for the construction of the line were hired on 21 August 1879. A short section of the line, from Wellington to Wadestown, was partially constructed. However, Grey's government was defeated at the September 1879 general election and left office in October 1879. The government of Sir John Hall took office and he had the line removed from the Public Works Estimates. Hall then created a Royal Commission to review the government's public works programme, with a view to reducing government expenditure. The Commission reviewed the Wellington-Manawatu line in March 1880, and concluded that work should be abandoned.

Company formation 
Backed by the Wellington Chamber of Commerce, a group of prominent Wellington businessmen decided to form a company to fund the railway's construction. They did so on 15 February 1881, issuing 100,000 shares at £5 each. By May 1881 43,000 shares had been sold, including a substantial package to Māori landowners in the Manawatu, who exchanged land along the proposed route for shares in the company.

In May 1881 the company signed a contract with the government to purchase the land, formation and materials used for building the line so far (which had already cost £30,000). The government made certain undertakings limiting the company's profitability and dividend payments, and made substantial grants of Crown land (210,500 acres or 85,186 hectares) to prevent land speculation and make the railway a viable entity. The total land grants were valued at £96,000.00. The contract stipulated the line was to be built within five years of commencement; it took four years and two months to build.  The contract also included a clause for the government to purchase the company in the future at a "fair value", something that was later to prove contentious.

The government had proposed that the new "West Coast" line would go via Foxton, but the new company (William Travers) said in February 1881 that the route would to follow the most direct route to Palmerston North (via Fitzherbert, connecting with the NZR at Longburn), so bypassing Foxton. This was a shorter and more direct route to Napier and Auckland (72 not 82 miles), and avoided "unproductive country" in favour of a route with potentially better hinterland. As the company was raising money by selling shares, William Fox said that the terminus had not yet been decided and that Travers was not authorised to make an announcement, and consideration of engineering difficulties and cost would be required (although the company directors would then choose the shorter route!). 

The Act had the effect of authorising the WMR (and also the New Zealand Midland Railway Company).

Construction of the line recommenced on 25 September 1882. Construction was completed on 27 October 1886, with the first through train running on 3 November; see Wellington–Manawatu Line

Operations 
The WMR was relatively successful and generated considerable revenue. Its land holdings proved to be a major revenue stream for the company; as sections of the lines opened, the land value around it increased and thus the WMR profited from its own operations. The new line opened up 5 million acres (2 million ha), and as the line length was 84.5 miles the company was entitled to £126,375 of land. The government allocated £96,570 of land within a 15-mile radius from the line and agreed to allocate £29,805 more of land from land acquired in the next five years. But while the company got Maori owners to agree to sell the Horowhenua Block the government did not act within five years, and ignored petitions to parliament. So the government offered in settlement only £5339 worth of land in 1894, knowing the company could not afford a lawsuit. The company had paid the government and local bodies £118,550, amounting to two-thirds of its paid-up capital and 20% more than the total value of the land grants. The cost of the railway and equipment to February 1905 was £1,010,197 with land grants amounting to £98,644. Since the grants were made,  the value of the land had appreciated by £6,369,837. And land sales raised money to complete the railway.

The railway's operations were advanced by standards of the time, having comfortable carriages, dining cars, electric lighting, and telephone communication between stations. By comparison, the government-operated network did not introduce dining cars until 1902. From 1895 the 53 lb/yard (26 kg/metre) rails on the Wellington-Plimmerton-Paekakariki section were replaced with 65 lb/yard (32 kg/metre) rails.  In 1900–02 the rolling stock was fitted with Westinghouse air brakes.

Dissolution 
The WMR was bought by the government in 1908 (as soon as it could be purchased without penalty), and was integrated into the New Zealand Railways Department from Monday 7 December 1908. The staff, 123 in 1886–87, grew to 382 by 1908, of whom 324 transferred to the NZR. The NZR also took over 20 locomotives, 56 bogie passenger cars, 14 brake vans, 343 wagons and two 10-ton hand cranes.

The company had paid a 6% or 7% annual dividend, a return averaging 13½% per year, and when the company was taken over shareholders got 55 to 60 shillings a share. Of the 633 shareholders on the Wellington register, 307 were "originals".

The line 

From the Thorndon terminus it wound up through the hills to Johnsonville, now the Johnsonville Branch. It then proceeded to Tawa, roughly along the line of the State Highway 1 motorway. This section was bypassed by the Tawa Flat deviation from 19 June 1937. From Tawa to Longburn the North Island Main Trunk line generally follows its route, through Porirua, Paekakariki, Paraparaumu, Otaki, and Shannon. The decision to pass through Shannon meant that the line joined the Foxton Branch in the middle, terminating at Longburn, rather than at Foxton — the routing was strongly debated, and was chosen as being more direct. A number of new towns were established along the route, notably Plimmerton, named after company director and "Father of Wellington" John Plimmer. Levin, named after William Hort Levin, and Shannon, named after George Vance Shannon (1842–1920), were also named after directors of the company.

The WMR used simple unprepossessing stations, stating in 1893 that it does not build stations for future generations of travellers as our Government seems to – but adapts expenditure to actual requirements leaving additions to be made as wanted.

Wellington (Thorndon) and Longburn station buildings were provisional, as the government procrastinated in building joint stations (and as it was suggested that WMR trains could run to Palmerston North over the NZR line, at a cost. WMR passenger trains eventually ran to Palmerston North Central railway station.)
Other stations were based on PWD designs for 4th, 5th & 6th class stations, They all had a central waiting area open at the front with seating along the rear and one side, and a simple sloped roof dropping to the rear but no verandah. The 4th & 5th class stations had an office with ticket slide at one end and a ladies’ waiting room at the other end, while the 6th class or Flag stations only had an office: 
Fourth Class (42 ft x 14 ft): Johnsonville, Paremata, Otaki, Shannon.
Fifth Class (34 ft 8 in x 14 ft 9 in): Crofton, Khandallah, Porirua, Plimmerton, Paekakariki.
Sixth Class (Flag) (about 15 ft x 8 ft): Tawa Flat, Plimmerton, Pukerua, Paraparaumu, Waikanae, Te Horo, Hadfield, Manukau, Ohau, Levin (original), Kereru, Makerua, Tokomaru, Linton.

Motive power 
The WMR operated 22 locomotives in revenue service, of which 20 were acquired by the government (the original Nos. 3 & 5 were sold to the Timaru Harbour Board).  The WMR classified its locomotives by number without class distinction; if a locomotive was withdrawn its number was re-used on a new locomotive.  When the WMR was acquired by the government, some locomotives joined existing classes (N and V), while others had new class designations established for them. These classes contained few locomotives, so all were withdrawn by 1931 during the 1925–35 standardisation programme. Seven engines were Vauclain compounds from Baldwin. WMR No. 13, built in 1894, was the first compound in New Zealand and the first narrow-gauge compound in the world.

No. 10 became particularly famous when, on 20 July 1892, it achieved 64.4 mph (103.6 km/h) hauling a test train along the level stretch of line between Levin and Shannon, at the time the world speed record for the  gauge.  The locomotive was withdrawn in 1928 and dumped in the Waimakariri River to help stabilise the riverbank, and its final resting place is a mystery.

No. 3 or Jumbo (WJ class) banked north out of Wellington for 25 years (to 1927) on the long and steep 1 in 40 grades up to Crofton (Ngaio) and Khandallah. Other steep grades going north were 1 in 66 between Plimmerton and Pukerua Bay; and going south 1 in 66 from Paekakariki to Pukerua Bay (the North–South Junction) and up to 1 in 54 from Tawa Flat (Tawa) to Johnsonville.

The WMR owned other locomotives for construction and maintenance.  These included a New Zealand Railways Department P class of 1876. Known as Weka, it was used by the WMR from 1882 until 1898, when it was sold to the Manawatu County Council for use on its Sanson Tramway.

Surviving relics 

Despite the WMR's short history and its disappearance long before the railway preservation movement began, a number of relics have survived. Of the locomotives, only No. 9 (later NZR N 453) is known to exist, the remains of which were recovered in 2003 by the Wellington and Manawatu Railway Trust. It is under active restoration at Steam Incorporated, Paekakariki. Sister locomotive No. 10 is believed to have been dumped complete along the Midland Line, but has yet to be discovered.  Railway archaeologist Tony Batchelor believes he may have found No. 7 (later NZR V 451) in Southland, but this has yet to be proven.

A number of items of rolling stock survive, including four passenger carriages – 43 ft car No. 35 (NZR A 1113), belonging to MOTAT; 50 ft cars No. 42 (NZR A 1120), stored at the Bush Tramway Club at Rotowaro, and No. 48 (NZR A 1126) and No. 52 (NZR A 1130), both owned by the NZR&LS and stored at the Silver Stream Railway, with No. 48 under active restoration. No bogie wagons are thought to exist, but seven L class 4-wheel wagons survive – one owned by the Wellington and Manawatu Railway Trust, one at the Ferrymead Railway, one in a private collection in Masterton and three owned by SteamRail Wanganui, in poor condition.

The bell at the concourse end of Wellington railway station's platform 6 is believed to be from WMR locomotive no. 17.

Infrastructure remains include the Johnsonville Line, a stone plaque on the eastern abutment of the bridge across Hutt Rd in Wellington, the foundations of the Belmont Viaduct near Johnsonville, most of the NIMT north of Tawa, the railway station at Shannon, the former Te Horo station (now at the Tokomaru Steam Museum) and the Forest Lakes rail bridge. A memorial at Otaihanga on the NIMT commemorates the driving of the WMR's last spike.

See also 
Harry Higginson
Arthur Fulton 
James Edward Fulton
Wellington-Manawatu Line
50-foot carriages of WMR

References

Citations

Bibliography

External links 
Wellington and Manawatu Railway Trust

Last Annual Report of the Wellington & Manawatu Railway Company
Paekakariki Rail & Heritage Museum

Another image from the brochure Country to be opened up by Railway showing a drawing of the Belmont viaduct
b/w pictures of the Belmont viaduct from Alexander Turnbull Library - 1880s, c1890, 1912.
Photo of Wadestown and the Manawatu Line from 1911 paper
1897 article on WMR Co from Cyclopaedia of New Zealand 
 

Rail transport in the Wellington Region
Railway companies of New Zealand
1908 disestablishments in New Zealand
Rail lines receiving land grants
Rail transport in Manawatū-Whanganui
New Zealand companies established in 1881
Railway companies established in 1881
Railway companies disestablished in 1908
Defunct transport companies of New Zealand